Ruth McGavigan (born 25 December 1976) is a Scottish mountain biker.

She represented Scotland at the 2006 Commonwealth Games mountain bike event.  She came second in the senior women category of the 2006 British Mountain Biking National Championships.

External links

1976 births
Living people
Scottish female cyclists
Scottish mountain bikers
Commonwealth Games competitors for Scotland
Cyclists at the 2006 Commonwealth Games
Place of birth missing (living people)
21st-century Scottish women